Kanimangalam Sastha Temple is Hindu temple situated in Kanimangalam, Thrissur City of Kerala, India. Lord Ayyappan is the main deity of the temple. Kanimangalam Sastha is the main participant of the famous Thrissur Pooram. Kanimangalam Sastha is the first Pooram entering the Vadakkunnathan Temple. Kanimangalam Sastha is the protector of all goddesses who take part in Thrissur Pooram.

References

Shiva temples in Kerala
Hindu temples in Thrissur
Tourist attractions in Thrissur
Thrissur Pooram